Ctenocephalides is a flea genus in the tribe Archaeopsyllini which includes the cat flea, Ctenocephalides felis and the dog flea, C canis.  Species and subspecies in the genus infest a wide variety of hosts, including sheep and goats, wild carnivores (such as foxes, civets and jackals), hares, hyraxes, ground squirrels and hedgehogs.

References

Siphonaptera genera
Pulicidae
Taxa named by Charles Wardell Stiles